The South Shields by-election was a by-election held for the United Kingdom House of Commons constituency of South Shields. It was triggered by the resignation of David Miliband, the previous Member of Parliament (MP) and former Foreign Secretary, who had held the seat for Labour since 2001. The by-election took place on 2 May 2013, coinciding with local elections across England.

The by-election was won by Emma Lewell-Buck of the Labour Party with 50.4% of the vote. The UK Independence Party (UKIP) came second with 24.2%, with the Conservatives dropping to third with 11.5%. The Liberal Democrats' candidate came seventh with just 1.4%, the Liberals' or Liberal Democrats' lowest share of the vote at a by-election since 1948.

Resignation of David Miliband 
The seat became vacant after David Miliband, the incumbent Member of Parliament (MP) and former Foreign Secretary, announced on 27 March 2013 that he intended to resign from Parliament, in order to take up a position as head of the International Rescue Committee in New York City. In an interview with the BBC, he also explained that he "feared" his continued involvement in British politics was a "distraction" to his brother Ed's leadership of the Labour Party. Miliband's resignation was formally announced on 15 April.

Date 
The date for the by-election was scheduled for 2 May 2013 to coincide with local elections across England, although none of those local elections were for councils or positions in South Shields – the nearest elections being for the county councils of Durham and Northumberland, and for the directly elected mayor of North Tyneside.

Candidates and campaign 

The Labour Party selected South Tyneside councillor Emma Lewell-Buck as its candidate on 10 April 2013. Mark Walsh, a fellow councillor, had been considered the favourite to be selected, but withdrew for "personal reasons" hours before the vote.

The Conservative Party selected the previous 2010 candidate Karen Allen to once again stand for the party on 11 April 2013.

The Liberal Democrats chose Hugh Annand as their candidate on 11 April 2013. Annand had previously stood in North East Hertfordshire and has also been chosen as the seventh candidate on their East of England party-list for the 2014 European elections.

The UK Independence Party announced on 7 April 2013 that Richard Elvin would be their candidate. Elvin finished second in the 2012 Middlesbrough by-election with 12% of the vote.

Alan "Howling Laud" Hope, the leader of the Official Monster Raving Loony Party and perennial by-election candidate, stood as the party's candidate.

Comedian Simon Brodkin, in character as Lee Nelson, was duly nominated as a candidate for 'Lee Nelson's Well Good Party', but then withdrew his nomination.

Result

See also
2013 United Kingdom local elections
1918 South Shields by-election
1916 South Shields by-election
1910 South Shields by-election
List of United Kingdom by-elections
Opinion polling for the next United Kingdom general election

References

South Shields by-election
South Shields by-election
South Shields by-election
21st century in Tyne and Wear
South Shields by-elections